Miloš Zarić, (born December 4, 1987, in Užice) is a Serbian athlete who competed for his nation in the Shot Put at the 2016 Summer Paralympics.

Miloš became the first Serbian athlete to compete at both the summer and winter Paralympic Games, following his appearances at the 2016 Summer Paralympics in Rio de Janeiro and the 2018 Winter Paralympics in Pyeongchang. He also became the first Serbian athlete to compete in Para cross-country skiing at the Paralympic Winter Games. "I am extremely happy that I am the first. No one has competed at the Winter and Summer Games before me. Now, I'm going to compete at the Paralympic Games every two years. It's unbelievable feeling.

External links
Miloš Zarić Profile

References

Paralympic athletes of Serbia
Athletes (track and field) at the 2016 Summer Paralympics
Living people
1987 births
Sportspeople from Užice
Track and field athletes with disabilities
Serbian people with disabilities
Sportsmen with disabilities
Serbian male shot putters
Serbian male javelin throwers